LittleBigPlanet is a 2008 platform game developed by Media Molecule and published by Sony Computer Entertainment for the PlayStation 3. The first game of the LittleBigPlanet franchise, the player character is Sackboy, a brown ragged doll with the ability to create. The level editor is the main focus of the game, allowing the player to create levels and publish them online. The premade levels in the story mode are built around Sackboy's basic control scheme. They are grouped into areas, each centring around a theme. The story mode revolves around Sackboy helping various Creator Curators around LittleBigPlanet before facing the Collector, who has been kidnapping and stealing creations.

Media Molecule was formed by four former Lionhead Studios employees after the release of Rag Doll Kung Fu (2005). The concept of a game that allowed the player to be creatively ambitious for the console was envisioned after a movie trip to Howl's Moving Castle. After a prototype called Craftworld was created in 2006, it was pitched to Sony Computer Entertainment Worldwide Studios president Phil Harrison. Harrison lauded the concept and agreed to fund the project. LittleBigPlanet was first announced by Harrison at Game Developers Conference 2006. After a marketing campaign and beta access, the game was slated for release in October 2008. After being delayed for a week to remove in-game song lyrics that could be offensive, it was ultimately released worldwide between late October to early November 2008.

LittleBigPlanet was met with universal acclaim and was nominated for and won many awards. Praise went to the gameplay, creative, and community aspects of the game. While sales initially dwindled for LittleBigPlanet, the game was ultimately a commercial success; reaching four million sales. It is considered among the greatest video games of all time. It is noted for its influence in the play, create, share genre. Although there were initially no plans to release a sequel, LittleBigPlanet became a franchise with LittleBigPlanet 2, spin-offs and LittleBigPlanet 3 and Sackboy became a mascot for Sony. The release of LittleBigPlanet coincided with the rise of user-generated content and helped launched a genre of level-editing games. Its online functionality was discontinued on 13 September 2021, alongside services for LittleBigPlanet 2, LittleBigPlanet PS Vita, and the PlayStation 3 version of LittleBigPlanet 3.

Gameplay

LittleBigPlanet is a physics-based platform game that is designed around the tagline "Play. Create. Share". The player can play the levels in the game, create levels, and share them online. The pod, which takes the form of a cardboard ship, serves as a hub to these options. The ability to play other levels is on the planet known as "LittleBigPlanet", where story mode and published levels are available. The level editor is on MyMoon, which also allows the player to publish levels onto LittleBigPlanet. The player character is a brown rag doll named "Sackboy" which can be customised through the use of costumes. Sackboy can run, jump, and grab objects that are made out of certain materials. He can also grab jetpacks to fly, move between the three layers of the game, and access a menu known as the "Popit", which has the appearance of a floating vertical rectangle connected to Sackboy with a filament. The Popit is the source of customising tools, stickers, and objects. The player can give Sackboy one of four emotions; happy, sad, scared, and angry; with varying degrees of severity.

The story mode of LittleBigPlanet consists of eight themed areas, each with three or four main levels. Keys are hidden throughout the main levels, which when collected unlock bonus levels. This adds up to a grand total of fifty levels. Each level is designed around the control scheme of Sackboy and the themes of their area. For example, the Metropolis involves navigating sewers and hopping on subways. Although the story mode is in sequential order, each of the levels can be replayed to collect prize bubbles, which contains items, including costumes, stickers, songs, and objects. There are also score bubbles, which when collected in a chain, can grant a multiplier to the amount of score gained from the score bubbles. Each of the levels also contains checkpoints, where Sackboy can respawn if he dies. Each checkpoint has three available uses, or in some cases, six available uses. If the last activated checkpoint runs out of uses, the level ends. The player has the ability to play the game with up to three other players. Some puzzles for finding prize bubbles in story mode require more than one player.

Content creation

The Popit gives Sackboy access to various creative tools. During story mode, the popit can only be used to access stickers and character customising. Stickers can be stamped on any object. In particular, in areas of the story mode, there are blank canvases that required a specific sticker to be placed on them for Sackboy to collect prize bubbles. The player may customise Sackboy in a range of ways. They are able to select a base colour and texture for their Sackboy from a range of materials and designs along with giving them accessories, including glasses and hats. They can also place stickers on Sackboy.

The main focus of LittleBigPlanet is the level editor, located on MyMoon. The editor incorporates a large number of editing tools and objects, accessible from the Popit, to create levels from a low to a high degree of complexity. There is a collection of interactive tutorials that are required to be completed in order to use their respective tools. To facilitate the creation process and to accommodate any mistakes made, the editor features a manipulatable time system, whereby the player may "rewind" the editor, which acts as an undo feature, or pause the editor, which temporarily halts objects that run under the physics engine, such as gravity acting on falling or rolling objects. The player may create new objects by starting with many basic shapes, such as circles, stars and squares, and "drawing" a shape into the level using one of the many materials. Objects may be glued to each other or to the level. More mechanical features are also available, such as connecting objects together with string, using bolts to spin objects, or using various kinds of triggers. Rocket motors can be attached to objects to propel them across a level. After creating custom objects, the player may save their creation to a library for later use, and share their object by placing it inside a prize bubble in their level, so that other players who play the level can collect it and may use it in their own levels.

A large part of LittleBigPlanet was the ability for level creators to publish their levels and objects to the online community for other people to play. The player could access the published levels through the planet, LittleBigPlanet. One of the options that were available was "Cool Levels", which allowed the player to play levels at random. These levels could be played with multiplayer, both online and local. Once a custom level has been played through, the player could tag the level with a list of predefined words and may cycle through the word choice to find the most appropriate. This allowed other players to quickly find their level of choice by searching a specific tag. They would also be able to rate the level out of five stars. There's a "heart" feature available to the player, which allows them to specify which levels, stickers and decorations they prefer. However, as of September 2021, the online servers for LittleBigPlanet have been shut down.

Plot

Setting and characters
LittleBigPlanet is set on the titular planet, a world full of creations made by Creator Curators. Sackboy explores through eight of the creations; each with a theme based on locations around the world. The eight creations are the Gardens, the Savannah, the Weddings, the Canyons, the Metropolis, the Islands, the Temples, and the Wilderness; each creator curators' being the King, Zola the Lion King, Frida, Uncle Jalapeño, Mags the Mechanic, Grandmaster Sensei, the Great Magician, and the Collector respectively. Each creation is based on Britain, Africa, South America, Mexico, America, Japan, India, and Siberia respectively.

Story
After Sackboy explores the Gardens, learning various tools along the way, the King sends Sackboy to the Savannah for him to begin his adventure. Sackboy accidentally destroys one of Zola's creations, but Zola agrees to forgive Sackboy if he finds out what is troubling the bison; the cause is discovered to be crocodiles. Their king, Croc, reveals that Meerkat Mum is accusing Croc of eating Meerkat Mum's son, Stripy Tail. Sackboy finds Stripy Tail at a VIP club in a disco and brings him to Meerkat Mum.

As Sackboy enters the Weddings, a butler reveals to him that Frida's groom, Don Lu, has gone missing. Sackboy finds Don Lu, who had gotten lost and exhausted in the dark crypts. Frida, however, goes on a rampage with a destructive machine called the Skulldozer, believing she has been abandoned by Don Lu. Sackboy destroys the Skulldozer and reunites Frida and Don Lu. Frida and Don Lu decide to travel to the Canyons for their honeymoon, and Don Lu invites Sackboy over to meet Don Lu's uncle, Jalapeño. There, a citizen named Devante reveals that Sheriff Zapata kidnapped Jalapeño. Sackboy and Devante free Jalapeño from his prison cell with the use of bombs. Sackboy finds Zapata in the Serpent Shrine, who tries to blow up Sackboy with bombs, killing himself in the process. Jalapeño, wanting a vacation, goes to the Metropolis with Sackboy. A resident mechanic Mags reveals that martial artist Ze Dude stole Mags's car. Ze Dude races Sackboy with the car but crashes it into a river. After Sackboy recovers the car from sewage, Ze Dude starts vandalizing Mags's construction site with a fireball machine. Sackboy fights and beats Ze Dude and his bouncers. Finding him a worthy fighter, Ze Dude sends Sackboy to the Islands. There, the Grandmaster Sensei trains Sackboy's skills as a warrior to fight the Terrible Oni. After Sackboy saves Grandmaster Sensei's flame-throwing cat from a sumo wrestler, the Sensei sends Sackboy to fight the Terrible Oni in the volcano. Afterwards, the Sensei sends Sackboy to the Temples to get a flame-throwing cat.

In the Temples, the Shopkeeper sends Sackboy to the Goddess for her to lead Sackboy's way. The Goddess reveals that the Great Magician needs help to "bring sharing back to LittleBigPlanet." The Great Magician reveals to Sackboy that the Collector is stealing creations around LittleBigPlanet and "not sharing them around the world." The Great Magician teleports Sackboy to the Wilderness to find the Collector. Sackboy breaches the Collector's base and starts freeing all the inhabitants of LittleBigPlanet from their cages, including the curator creators. Sackboy confronts the Collector, who attacks Sackboy with machines. After Sackboy destroys his machines, the Collector tries to escape through his pod, which breaks down. Defeated, the Collector admits that he went evil because he has no friends to share with. The King appears and addresses the player, calling for them to be a part of the LittleBigPlanet community.

Development

Background and concept

Prior to forming Media Molecule; Mark Healey, Kareem Ettouney, Alex Evans, and Dave Smith worked at Lionhead Studios and developed the 3D platformer Rag Doll Kung Fu (2005), the first third-party video game released on Steam. After a cinema visit to see Howl's Moving Castle, Healey and Smith discussed a game that had character controls similar to Rag Doll Kung Fu that would be playable on a console. Healey and Smith left Lionhead Studios in December 2005 along with Evans and Ettouney. When they initially formed Media Molecule, back then known as Brainfluff, they had only had a vague idea of what game they wanted to create. They wanted to create an ambitious console-friendly game that utilised user-generated content, appealed to a broad audience, and proved that a small company could develop a mainstream game.

Media Molecule arranged a meeting with Phil Harrison, the president of Sony Computer Entertainment Worldwide Studios. They created a prototype of their idea, a game called Craftworld, a physics-based, 2D side-scrolling game, with a placeholder character called Mr. Yellowhead. The company chose to pitch their idea to Harrison using their own software, rather than PowerPoint, which allowed for bullet-point information as in standard presentations, but also for live, controllable movement of game characters. Media Molecule pitched the prototype to Harrison in January 2006. By their own admission, the pitch was vague and they had deliberately toned down the creative aspect of the game—which they felt may have appeared as "weird" for a console game—for fear of negative reception of their pitch by Sony. They presented the prototype purely as a playable game, and only briefly mentioned the user-created content aspect; Evans relates that Harrison actually picked up on the creative side, and had asked them why they had chosen not to explore this element further. The meeting, which had been scheduled to last 45 minutes, eventually lasted 3 hours at the end of which, Sony agreed to fund the project for six months. Media Molecule became incorporated as a company in February 2006.

After some further development, the team was asked to present what they had done to Sony in what Healey describes as a "Dragons' Den style scenario". Following this, Sony gave them a deal to develop LittleBigPlanet for the PlayStation 3 in exchange for exclusivity and ownership of the intellectual property. Despite backing from Sony, Media Molecule was unsure about exactly what direction they were going to take the game. They also worried about whether people would understand, or even like the game, but these worries were dispelled after its first presentation at Game Developers Conference 2007 (GDC 2007). Media Molecule was aware of the fact that Sony wanted them to demonstrate the game at the upcoming convention, but they were not told they were to be part of Phil Harrison's keynote speech until near the date it was due to take place. Healey stated that it was only when they arrived in San Francisco for the conference that they realised just how much Sony was devoted to the game—much more than Media Molecule had previously thought. Healey relates that although the revelation of Sony's faith in the game boosted their confidence, it increased the pressure on them. They realised that their task had become much greater than originally anticipated.

Design
Healey was the creative director, Ettouney was the art director, and Evans and Smith were the technical directors. LittleBigPlanet was designed around its associated tagline: "Play, Create, Share". Players could play the story levels, create levels using the creation tools, and publish them to the community for others to play. Healey wanted LittleBigPlanet to bridge the gap between casual and hardcore gaming. A particular goal was to make it so players could create levels of higher quality than even the story levels. Though the game was meant to be ambitious and to allow players to creatively express themselves, constraints were placed on the game deliberately to make the game more focused and fun and to appeal to uncreative people.

Prior to the creation of Sackboy, Smith designed Mr. Yellowhead to be the player character for the Craftworld prototype. After the prototype was showcased to Harrison, the design of Mr. Yellowhead would evolve into the modern form of Sackboy overtime. The reason Sackboy was created was to serve as the customisable avatar for the player. For this reason, it was not given a voice or defined personality. One of the goals of designing Sackboy was to make him appeal to a broad audience. The zipper used on the modern design was initially going to be used to access Create Mode, though it was scrapped and eventually replaced with MyMoon.

LittleBigPlanet was designed to be supported post-release, with Evans stating that Media Molecule would be supporting the community "massively". Through the use of updates, Media Molecule could make changes to the game after release. The studio also has the ability to add content packs, new game modes, and new objects. Although, there were no plans to add additional features through updates, they did decide to use patches to add LittleBigStore and online access to Create mode, neither of which were available when the game first released. Originally, Harrison wanted to create LittleBigPlanet as a downloadable service that monetised user-generated content, but it was scrapped early on.

Audio and music

Kenneth Young, Daniel Pemberton, and Mat Clark were the composers for LittleBigPlanet. Young also served as the audio designer, while Matt Willis served as the audio programmer. Stephen Fry serves as the narrator. Young joined Media Molecule in 2007 following their presentation at GDC. He did the majority of the sound work and composed a few of the songs, along with "directing the composers and the creative side of the music licensing process, producing the voice localisation from the Mm side of things, [and] being heavily involved in the design of the audio-centric UGC features of the game." A soundtrack album titled LittleBigMusic was eventually released digitally containing the music Pemberton composed.

LittleBigPlanet contains 21 tracks that were licensed by other producers and 14 original tracks made by the composers. Young was the one who found the songs and got them licensed. Key bands that licensed one of their songs to the game include the Go! Team and Battles. The main theme was composed by Pemberton. Some of the original tracks are called "interactive tracks", most of which were composed by Clark. The interactive tracks allow players to change what instruments are playing at any given time. Much of the original music took influence from world music, mashups, and 1970s television shows for children. Early on in 2006, there were plans to add a music sequencer for players to create their own music, but it was scrapped until the development of LittleBigPlanet 2.

One of the licensed songs in the game is Toumani Diabate's "Tapha Niang" from Boulevard de l'Independance (2006). The song contained lyrics sung by Moussa Diabate that lamented the death of his brother Mustapha and contained references to the Qur'an, the Islamic religious text. The inclusion of the song in beta versions of LittleBigPlanet was met with controversy among Muslim gamers who found combining the text of the Qur'an with music to be offensive, despite Toumani being a "devout Muslim". They requested Sony Computer Entertainment (SCE) to remove the track via a patch. This led to a worldwide recall of LittleBigPlanet from retailers on 17 October 2008 and the release of LittleBigPlanet to be delayed. Version 1.02 would be implemented, removing the lyrical content of "Tapha Niang".

Release

Promotion and anticipation

LittleBigPlanet was first announced in March 2007 at GDC during Harrison's keynote address. The keynote address was about innovative trends of customisation and social interaction among contemporary games, which he dubbed "Game 3.0". The presentation of LittleBigPlanet included a demonstration of various creative tools followed by a pre-made level. The game was later presented in similar fashion in July 2007 at the Electronic Entertainment Expo (E3). It was showcased at the Tokyo Game Show (TGS) in September 2007, at the Consumer Electronics Show (CES) in January 2008, and at the Leipzig Games Convention in August 2008. LittleBigPlanet was also showcased for a second time at E3 in July 2008 and at TSG in October 2008.

SCE undertook a pre-order campaign in the run-up to the game's release. In August 2008 in North America, SCE partnered with several major online retailers to offer unique bonus gifts to customers pre-ordering the game from the selected retailers. These gifts include a sticker book, a burlap pouch, and an official game guide, along with downloadable costumes for Sackboy of Kratos from God of War and Nariko from Heavenly Sword. According to Engadget, while the United States got all pre-order bonuses, Canada only got the Kratos and Nariko costumes. In Europe, Play.com offered the costume of Nariko to customers who pre-ordered the game.

Around May 2007, a demo of LittleBigPlanet was rumoured. Although it was planned to the be released in late 2007, by the end of the year, public relations officer Ron Eagle confirmed that there would be no demo that year. In September 2008, a limited public beta was made available with a focus on stress testing the sharing functions of LittleBigPlanet. Availability lasted from 24 September11 October 2008. In order to access it, the player would have to have a beta key, which was a code that could be inputted in the PlayStation Store for access to the beta test. Various sites gave out beta keys around that time, including Eurogamer and IGN.

After GDC 2007, LittleBigPlanet had become anticipated by various gamers before release. The concept was well-received among the press and was especially anticipated by those with access to the beta version. Jeremy Dunham of IGN reported that in GDC 2007, "even in the presence of Home, Sony's impressive new community software, LittleBigPlanet stole the show at Phil Harrison's Game 3.0 practice conference, and was the thing that everyone was talking about." The presentation for E3 2007 won the Game Critics Awards for "Best Original Game", and the presentation for E3 2008 won "Best Console Game" and "Best Social/Casual/Puzzle". Evans has expressed surprise by the hype of the game; he stated, "We had no expectation that it would become so strongly associated as a lead title on a platform."

Release and further development
Original announcements pointed to a full release early in 2008, but Sony later said the game had been delayed until September 2008 in the UK. During the Sony PlayStation Day on 6 May 2008 in London, Sony announced the game would be delayed for October. By September 2008, the release date was confirmed to be 21 October 2008 in North and Latin America, with a European release later that week. However, it was brought to the attention of SCE that the in-game song, "Tapha Niang", contained expressions from the Qur'an. On 17 October, SCE instigated a recall of all copies of LittleBigPlanet from retailers to avoid offending Muslims and to remove the lyrics. This recall resulted in the release of the game to be delayed.

Before LittleBigPlanet release, two patches were released. Version 1.01 added new costumes and tweaks online functionality, and version 1.02 removed the lyrics from "Tapha Niang". LittleBigPlanet was first released in North America on 27 October 2008, with the servers activating the same day. It was then released in Japan on 30 October, Europe on 5 November 2008, and Australia on 7 November. All levels that were created during the beta phases were transferred over to the final version. On 28 October, the servers were shut down due to "glitching issues". Version 1.03 was released 30 October to lighten server loads.

On 19 December 2008, version 1.07 was released, featuring the addition of an in-game store to buy downloadable content (DLC) and an overhaul of the level search function. Version 1.12, codanamed the "Cornish Yarg" update, was released on 16 April 2009. It featured a music player that allowed users to play songs from the PlayStation menu and an improved decoration mode, among other fixes. Version 1.21 was codenamed the "Leerdammer" update, and was released on 30 November 2009. It added the ability to access create mode while online with friends, along with a more location-based matchmaking system and various other changes.

A Game of the Year Edition of LittleBigPlanet was released in North America on 8 September 2009. This version included all of the content from the original game, as well as exclusive levels from 18 members of the LittleBigPlanet community. The re-release also includes the Metal Gear Solid, Monsters, and History costume and level packs and the Animals costume pack. A limited number of copies of the game also included a code, giving the player access to a beta of ModNation Racers. Initially, there were no plans to release the Game of the Year Edition in Europe, however a version for the United Kingdom was eventually announced for release on 16 April 2010.

LBP.me, the community web portal for LittleBigPlanet that allowed players to search for community levels, was launched in December 2010. Following the 2011 PlayStation Network outage, Sony offered two free selections out of five games as part of the "Welcome Back" campaign for 30 days, one of which was LittleBigPlanet. In July 2016, all LittleBigPlanet servers shut down in Japan, though they remained online outside of Japan besides LittleBigPlanet Karting and LittleBigPlanet PS Vita. LBP.me was shut down in November 2020. In March 2021, all the servers in the LittleBigPlanet franchise shut down. Although the cited reason was "technical issues", many players believed it was because of a DDOS attack. Although, the servers were briefly taken back online in May 2021, they were taken down again because of DDOS attacks, harassment, and hate speech. The servers were permanently closed in September 2021 after months of issues, with the exception of the PlayStation 4 port of LittleBigPlanet 3.

Downloadable content

Over the years, LittleBigPlanet and the franchise it spawned has gathered a large amount of DLC. Most of them was based on third-party media, which in the first game were typically PlayStation games and "longstanding transmedia properties" like Disney. In general, there were two types of DLC, costume packs and level kits. Categories of costume packs include "Seasonal & Limited Time", regular, and licensed. Seasonal & Limited Time costumes are free, while regular and licensed costumes require payment. The DLC in the first game were made compatible with other games in the franchise in August 2012. The first level kit was the Festive Level Pack, which contained Christmas-related objects and stickers. It was available from 18 December 20088 January 2009.

A level kit and costume pack based on Metal Gear Solid was released on 23 December 2008. The level kit had five main levels and various objects and stickers. One of the objects was the Paintinator. On 23 April 2009, Creator Pack 1 was released as a downloadable content pack for free. This pack added new Create mode tools including a new type of checkpoint which provides the player with an infinite number of lives for a given section, a tetherless version of the jetpack and a power-up removal marker that forces the player to drop any power-ups such as the jetpack. The History Kit was released on 13 August 2009 with various historical-themed objects and stickers along with a sound object and music track. Three new songs composed by Clark were released on 8 October 2009 as the MM Music Pack 1. They were "Well Trained", "Wise Owl", and "Tea By The Sea".

After being announced in August 2009, water was added in the game through a level kit based on Pirates of the Caribbean was released on 22 December 2009, along with a related costume pack. The level kit also had five levels and various objects and stickers. DLC related to the Incredibles, which includes costumes based on the characters and a level kit containing themed stickers and items, was released on 8 April 2010. Marvel DLC was added to LittleBigPlanet on 7 July 2010, including a few costumes and a level kit containing Marvel-themed stickers, music, and items. On 31 December 2015, the Marvel DLC was removed from the PlayStation Store making them unavailable to players who had not purchased them at the time. On 21 December 2017, all Disney-related DLC for the franchise was removed from the PlayStation Store. This included many costume packs and the two Disney-related level kits from the first game that were based on Pirates of the Caribbean and the Incredibles.

Reception

Reviews
LittleBigPlanet has received universal acclaim from reviewers. On Metacritic, LittleBigPlanet received an aggregate score of 95/100 indicating "universal acclaim", based on 85 reviews. Mike D'Alonzo of X-Play stated, "The game has a few issues that could certainly use some tweaking, but they don’t even come close to making this anything less than one of the most incredible games ever made." GamePro Tae K. Kim called LittleBigPlanet "one of the most amazing and interesting gaming experiences ever designed." LittleBigPlanet was called by Edge "one of gaming's rare triumphs."

The creative aspect of LittleBigPlanet has been widely praised by critics, though some have noted how it takes patience to create a great level. Nick Suttner from 1Up.com praised create mode, claiming that it allowed the player to create any level they wanted and share it. Mike Jackson of Computer and Video Games pointed out that user-generated content had been talked about in the gaming industry, and felt that Sony successfully created a great game in this matter with LittleBigPlanet. Game Informer Joe Juba has noted how "The tools are complicated enough to perform complex tasks, but simple enough to be accessible to any motivated gamer." Kim agrees and praised the create mode for being "powerful enough" for the player to create the desired level. Oli Welsh from Eurogamer said that LittleBigPlanet "creative tools turn it into something else entirely, a unique, hilarious, endless entertainment."

The community aspect has also been widely praised. Some critics have recommended playing LittleBigPlanet with an online connection. D'Alonzo found the online community features to be "as slick as they are accessible." Welsh in particular found the tagging and heart system after playing each community level to be "genius". Despite the praise to the community, views of LittleBigPlanet multiplayer were largely mixed. Guy Cocker of GameSpot wrote that LittleBigPlanet was more fun when playing with multiple players, but more flawed as a result; citing the "memorable" multiplayer puzzles as good, but the clunkiness of the multiplayer in general as bad. Matt Wales from IGN noticed that cooperative play was not a significant part of the game.

The story mode was generally praised. Chris Roper of IGN found the first three levels of the story mode to be "good tutorials". Leon Purley of PlayStation Official Magazine – UK praised the mix of "action, challenge, and wonder" in the story mode, finding the quality to be perfect and recommending it those who are weary about the create mode. Suttner said that story mode "features some of the most endearing 2D levels in modern gaming." John Teti writing for The A.V. Club called the plot brief and brilliant with replay value. In contrast, Seth Schiesel of The New York Times found it to be lacklustre, finding the levels made by the community to be better. Variety Ben Fritz found the story mode to be "less [of] an experience . . . than an exercise in collecting hundreds of items and tools and learning how to use them."

Sales
Despite the wide publicity LittleBigPlanet had before and after release, sales dwindled before 2009. In the UK, LittleBigPlanet entered the all-formats charts, recorded by the ELSPA, at #4 before dropping, being at #19 by November 2008. before dropping to #29. LittleBigPlanet sales increased by 58 percent and raised it from #29 to #16 in the charts by mid-December. In the US, the game sold 356,000 units during October and November placing it fourth amongst all PlayStation 3 software sales for that period. It entered October's chart, recorded by the NPD Group, at #8 before falling out of the top 20 by the end of November. In Japan, LittleBigPlanet had 52,000 copies sold. Sony responded to the lacklustre sales by saying that they were pleased by the performance, citing the LittleBigPlanet being a new IP and claiming that it was released in a "incredibly volatile time of year and the chart reflects that."

In January 2009, Sony announced that the game had sold 611,000 units in North America up to the end of December 2008 and that LittleBigPlanet sold 1.3 million units worldwide. The game sold 300,000 units at the beginning of February 2009. By March 2010, the game has sold over 3 million copies worldwide. Following the PSN outage in April 2011, LittleBigPlanet gained 1.5 million new users. By October 2018, LittleBigPlanet had sold 4 million copies.

Awards
LittleBigPlanet has been included among the greatest video games of all time. Eurogamer and Gamepro listed the game as the best game of 2008. It also received various other awards from gaming websites in 2008 including "Best New IP" and "Best Platform Game" from IGN and "Most Innovative Game" from GameTrailers. LittleBigPlanet has been nominated for and won numerous awards. LittleBigPlanet won the most awards in the 10th Annual NAVGTR Awards in 2008, winning six of the ten awards it was nominated for. They were "Game of the Year", "Game Design", "Game Original Children's", "Graphics/Technical", Innovation in Game Play", and "Supp Performance in a Comedy". LittleBigPlanet was judged "Best PlayStation 3 Game" at the 2008 Spike Video Game Awards. LittleBigPlanet was given the award for "Artistic Achievement" at the 5th British Academy Video Games Awards. It won in eight categories out of ten nominations at the AIAS Interactive Achievement Awards including "Outstanding Achievement in Art Direction", "Outstanding Achievement in Visual Engineering", "Outstanding Achievement in Game Design", "Outstanding Achievement in Game Direction", and "Outstanding Innovation in Gaming", and was judged "Family Game of the Year", "Console Game of the Year", and "Overall Game of the Year". It was given the awards for "Best New Debut", "Best Game Design", "Best Technology", and the "Innovation Award" at the Game Developers Choice Awards. It won all the categories it was nominated for in the 2009 Develop Industry Excellence Awards, winning "Best New IP", "Technical Innovation", and "Visual Arts". It won "Family Game of the Year" in the Golden Joystick Awards.

Legacy

Community
Around the time of its release, LittleBigPlanet took off in popularity, with Mikel Reparaz of GamesRadar+ having noticed in November 2008 that "hundreds, if not thousands, of PSN users ha[d] been uploading a continuous stream of homemade levels to the game’s straining servers, with varying levels of quality and dedication." By July 2009, one million levels had been published on LittleBigPlanet, and by July 2013, eight million levels had been published across the franchise. There was a variety of levels created including side-scrolling shooters. Reportedly, levels were being created that went "beyond even Media Molecule's wildest expectations." After a 2011 PSN outage, Evans had observed that multiple levels were being published per second and that "basically, everybody publishes a level." By the time the servers shut down for all games in the franchise with the exception of the PS4 port of LittleBigPlanet 3, ten million levels had been published across the franchise.

Despite the popularity, there has been little scholarly research on the culture surrounding LittleBigPlanet. Though an early analysis focused on the commercial and technological infrastructures influence on player innovation, later studies would focus on player agency within the community. Sara M. Grimes of Cultural Studies noted how the cultural scene is "tethered" to Sony and integrates player-based activity and cultures into the LittleBigPlanet brand. She concluded that the digital culture surrounding LittleBigPlanet could either be a call to revisit ways cultural scenes can be evaluated or a corporate-controlled infrastructure that is too broad to be considered a cultural scene.

Influence
While LittleBigPlanet was not the first game to be marketed around user creation and PC players could modify PC games, these types of tools were not available to console players at the time. LittleBigPlanet was not only the first game of this type on console, but the first mainstream game to give players creative tools to create levels and share them to the community. It coincided with the rise of user-generated content and proved that developing creation tools for video games was worth investing in. It was also an early example of website integration and public beta testing, which was not common before then. By January 2009, Peter Molyneux of Lionhead Studio had declared the game to be  "the most important creative innovation of 2008".

The success of LittleBigPlanet kickstarted a genre of video games where the player could create their own levels. Sony would apply the tagline "Play, Create, Share" to their racing game, ModNation Racers. While it was not as successful as LittleBigPlanet, other games like Trials, Planet Minigolf, and Joe Danger would follow suit in applying the same philosophy. Other games in the genre include Minecraft and Super Mario Maker. After distancing themselves from the LittleBigPlanet franchise, Media Molecule developed Dreams, which further expanded upon game creation.

Franchise

Sackboy became an iconic mascot for Sony. Media Molecule and Sony initially indicated that there were no plans to create a traditional sequel to LittleBigPlanet. Alex Evans said he did not want to ship a traditional sequel because of the "huge emotional investment" users have made in LittleBigPlanet. Game creators focused on  "expand[ing] the game without partitioning the audience" to preserve the user-generated content from LBP. LittleBigPlanet would eventually spawn many follow-ups. Metacritic reported that most of the follow-ups received positive reviews. The exceptions are Sackboy's Prehistoric Moves, LittleBigPlanet Karting, and Run Sackboy! Run!, which received "mixed or average reviews".

In February 2009, Sony announced a spin-off of LittleBigPlanet for the PlayStation Portable developed by SCE Cambridge Studio and Media Molecule, which was released in November 2009. Media Molecule announced in May 2010 that LittleBigPlanet 2 was in development, amid recent rumours. Sackboy's Prehistoric Moves, a demo of LittleBigPlanet 2 meant to introduce PlayStation Move, was released on January 18, 2010. The sequel was released in January 2011. A second spin-off for the PlayStation Vita was announced alongside the PlayStation Vita, back then known as "Next Generation Portable" in January 2011. The game, titled LittleBigPlanet PS Vita, would be developed in conjunction between Tarsier Studios and Double Eleven and it would be released in September 2012. A racing spin-off titled LittleBigPlanet Karting was rumoured to have been announced at a retailer event hosted by Sony in February 2012. It would be confirmed by Sony the same month. The game would be primarily developed by United Front Games, with Media Molecule serving as a supporting developer, and it would be released in November 2012.

A direct sequel to LittleBigPlanet 2, developed by Sumo Digital, would be announced in June 2014 at Electronic Entertainment Expo. With the exception of during early development, Media Molecule was largely uninvolved in LittleBigPlanet 3 as they were working on Tearaway and Dreams at the time and Media Molecule wanted to "step away" from the franchise. The game was released in November 2014 for the PlayStation 3 and PlayStation 4. In September 2014, a free to play endless running game spin-off developed by Firesprite titled Run Sackboy! Run! was announced. It was released in October 2014 for the Android and iOS and on March 31, 2015, for the PlayStation Vita.  After a hiatus, Sackboy: A Big Adventure, a 3D platform game developed by Sumo Digital, was announced in June 2020 at Sony's Future of Gaming event. Unlike most of the previous games, it does not feature Create Mode akin to the previous games. It was released in November 2020 for the PlayStation 4 and PlayStation 5.

See also
 List of PlayStation 3 games
 List of LittleBigPlanet downloadable content packs
 ModNation Racers
 Rag Doll Kung Fu: Fists of Plastic

Notes

References

External links
Official website
Developer website
LittleBigPlanet on MobyGames

2008 video games
AIAS Game of the Year winners
Interactive Achievement Award winners
LittleBigPlanet
Platform games
PlayStation 3 games
PlayStation 3-only games
Puzzle video games
Science fantasy video games
Side-scrolling video games
Sony Interactive Entertainment games
Video games developed in the United Kingdom
Video games scored by Daniel Pemberton
Video games scored by Kenneth Young
Video games set on fictional planets
Video games with 2.5D graphics
Video games with downloadable content
Video games with user-generated gameplay content
Media Molecule
Multiplayer and single-player video games
BAFTA winners (video games)
Products and services discontinued in 2021
Inactive online games
D.I.C.E. Award for Family Game of the Year winners